Sabine Bauer is a German harpsichordist, pianofortiste and flautist specialising in the repertoire of Baroque music and classical period, adept at historically informed performance, i.e. performance on ancient instruments (or copies of ancient instruments).

Formation 

She then continued her studies with Andreas Staier, Ton Koopman and Gustav Leonhardt.

Career 
In 1979, Bauer was one of the founding members of the ensemble Camerata Köln, together with Michael Schneider (flute), Ingeborg Scheerer (violin), Sabine Lier (violin) and Rainer Zipperling (cello and viola da gamba).

She then joined the ensemble La Stagione Frankfurt founded by Michael Schneider.

In addition to her activity as harpsichordist in these two ensembles, she regularly accompanies singers and instrumentalists in chamber music works and has also performed and recorded with the Musica Antiqua Köln ensemble.

Since 1986, Bauer has been a lecturer at the Frankfurt University of Music and Performing Arts and teaches harpsichord, basso continuo and chamber music at the Academy of Music in Darmstadt.

Repertoire 
With Michael Schneider and his ensemble La Stagione Frankfurt, whose slogan is Unerhörtes hörbar machen ('Make the unheard heard'), Bauer is committed to making little-known composers representative of the  heard.

She has also worked the classical and romantic Lied repertoire by accompanying the bass-baritone Gotthold Schwarz on harpsichord and fortepiano.

Recordings 
 1994: Goldberg Variations by Johann Sebastian Bach. (Ars Musici)
 1995: Deutsche und niederländische Blockflötenmusik des 18. Jahrhundert with Michael Schneider and Annette Schneider
 1996: Concerti by Georg Matthias Monn, with La Stagione Frankfurt, cellist Rainer Zipperling and violinist Mary Utiger
 1997: Englische und Italienische Blockflötenmusik des 17.&18. Jahrhunderts, with Michael Schneider, Rainer Zipperling and Yasunori Imamura
 2003: Concerto for harpsichord op.11  by Karl Friedrich Abel, with La Stagione Frankfurt
 2004: Concertos for harpsichord by Jiří Antonín Benda, with La Stagione Frankfurt
 Bach in Cembalo e Viola da Gamba, with Rainer Zipperling on the viola da gamba

References

External links 
 Sabine Bauer on BNF
 

German harpsichordists
Fortepianists
Date of birth unknown
Place of birth unknown